The Ozone Vibe is a French single-place paraglider that was designed by hang gliding and paragliding world champion pilot Robbie Whittall and produced by Ozone Gliders of Le Bar-sur-Loup. It is no longer in production.

Design and development
The Vibe was designed as an intermediate recreational sports glider. This was the first model the company produced that came in six different sizes, allowing more precise matching of pilot weight and wing loading. The models are each named for their relative size.

Operational history
Reviewer Noel Bertrand described the Ozone series of gliders in a 2003 review as, "wings that are both pleasant to fly and high performance in their respective categories".

Variants
Vibe XS
Extra small-sized model for much lighter pilots. The glider model is DHV 1-2 certified.
Vibe S
Small-sized model for lighter pilots. The glider model is DHV 1-2 certified.
Vibe MS
Medium-small-sized model for medium-weight pilots. The glider model is DHV 1-2 certified.
Vibe ML
Medium-large-sized model for medium-weight pilots. The glider model is DHV 1-2 certified.
Vibe L
Large-sized model for heavier pilots. The glider model is DHV 1-2 certified.
Vibe XL
Extra large-sized model for much heavier pilots. The glider model is DHV 1-2 certified.

Specifications (Vibe ML)

References

External links

Vibe
Paragliders